Arseny Aleksandrovich Tarkovsky (27 May 1989) was a Soviet and Russian poet and translator. He was predeceased by his son, film director Andrei Tarkovsky.

Biography

Family
Tarkovsky was born on 25 June N.S. 1907 in Yelisavetgrad, Kherson Governorate, Russian Empire (now Kropyvnytskyi, Ukraine). His father, Aleksandr Tarkovsky (in ), was a bank clerk, Russian revolutionary (Narodnik), and amateur actor of Polish origin and his mother was Maria Danilovna Rachkovskaya.

Youth
In 1921, Tarkovsky and his friends published a poem which contained an acrostic about Lenin. They were arrested, and sent to Nikolayev for execution. Tarkovsky was the only one that managed to escape.

Career
By 1924 Tarkovsky moved to Moscow, and from 1924 to 1925 he worked for a newspaper for railroad workers called Gudok, where he managed an editorial section written in verse. In 1925–1929 he studied literature at a university college in Moscow. At that time he translated poetry from Azerbaijanian, Georgian, Armenian and Arabic.

During World War II he volunteered as a war-correspondent at the army newspaper Boevaya Trevoga (War Alarm). He was wounded in action in 1943. The leg wound he received caused gas gangrene, and Tarkovsky had to undergo six gradual amputations.

Arseny Tarkovsky was mainly known as a translator of Abu'l-Ala-Al-Ma'arri, Nizami, Magtymguly, Kemine, Sayat-Nova, Vazha-Pshavela, Adam Mickiewicz, Mollanepes, Grigol Orbeliani and many other poets. His first collection of poetry, Before snow, was published in 1962.

Death

He lived mostly in Moscow and Peredelkino and died on 27 May 1989, in Moscow. In 1989 he was posthumously awarded the USSR State Prize.

Books
Перед снегом – Before snow (1962); 
Земле земное – To Earth Its Own (1966);
Вестник – Messenger (1969); 
Стихотворения – Poems (1974); 
Зимний день – Winter Day (1980); 
Избранное – Selected works (1982);
Стихи разных лет – Poems of different years (1983)compilation of early verse;
От юности до старости – From Youth to Old Age (1987);
Благословенный свет – The Blessed Light (1993).

Notes

External links
 Biography
 Some poems translated to English 
 Biography and works of Arseny Tarkovsky
 Another biography
  A selection of three poems in English translation in Harvard Review: "Housewarming," "Dreams," and "The Azov Steppe".

1907 births
1989 deaths
20th-century Russian male writers
20th-century Russian poets
20th-century Russian translators
Writers from Kropyvnytskyi
People from Yelisavetgradsky Uyezd
Recipients of the Order of Friendship of Peoples
Recipients of the Order of the Red Banner of Labour
Recipients of the Order of the Red Star
Recipients of the USSR State Prize
Translators from Arabic
Translators from Armenian
Translators from Georgian
Translators from Polish
Translators from Serbian
Translators from Turkmen
Translators to Russian
Russian people of Polish descent
Soviet male poets
Soviet translators